Girardia is a genus of freshwater planarians belonging to the family Dugesiidae.

Distribution
The genus Girardia is endemic to the Americas, from Argentina to Canada, although most species occur in South America. The only two species known to occur naturally in North America, Girardia tigrina and Girardia dorotocephala, have been introduced in other continents and islands.

Description
Species of Girardia are very similar to species of other genera of Dugesiidae and few apomorphies that clearly define the genus are known. One of the few exclusive characteristics is the presence of pigment granules in the outer pharyngeal wall.

Until 1991 Girardia was considered a subgenus of Dugesia, then it was upgraded to the genus rank. However, some works continued to use the old genus for some Girardia species, mainly for Girardia dorotocephala and Girardia tigrina.

Species

Girardia anceps (Kenk, 1930)
Girardia anderlani (Kawakatsu & Hauser, 1983)
Girardia andina (Borelli, 1895)
Girardia antillana (Kenk, 1941)
Girardia arenicola Hellmann & Leal-Zanchet, 2018
Girardia arimana (Hyman, 1957)
Girardia arizonensis (Kenk, 1975)
Girardia arndti Marcus, 1946
Girardia asymmetrica Hellmann & Leal-Zanchet, 2020
Girardia aurita (Kennel, 1888)
Girardia avertiginis Sluys, 2005
Girardia azteca (Benazzi & Giannini, 1971)
Girardia barbarae (Mitchell & Kawakatsu, 1973)
Girardia biapertura Sluys, 1997
Girardia bonaerensis (Moretto, 1996)
Girardia bursalacertosa Sluys, 2005
Girardia cameliae (Furhmann, 1912)
Girardia canai Curino & Cazzaniga, 1993
Girardia capacivasa Sluys & Kawakatsu, 2005
Girardia corumbataiensis Morais & Leal-Zanchet, 2021
Girardia chilla (Marcus, 1954)
Girardia cubana (Codreanu & Balcesco, 1973)
Girardia desiderensis Souza & Leal-Zanchet, 2016
Girardia dorotocephala (Woodworth, 1897)
Girardia dubia (Borelli, 1895)
Girardia festae (Borelli, 1898)
Girardia glandulosa (Kenk, 1930)
Girardia graffi (Weiss, 1909)
Girardia guatemalensis (Mitchell & Kawakatsu, 1973)
Girardia hoernesi (Weiss, 1910)
Girardia hypoglauca (Marcus, 1948)
Girardia ibitipoca Hellmann & Leal-Zanchet, 2020
Girardia informis Sluys & Grant, 2006
Girardia jenkinsae (Benazzi & Gourbault, 1977)
Girardia jugosa Sluys, 2005
Girardia longistriata (Furhmann, 1912)
Girardia mckenziei (Mitchell & Kawakatsu, 1973)
Girardia microbursalis (Hyman, 1931)
Girardia multidiverticulata Souza, Morais, Cordeiro & Leal-Zanchet, 2015
Girardia nobrensis Morais & Leal-Zanchet, 2021
Girardia nonatoi (Marcus, 1946)
Girardia paramensis (Fuhrmann, 1912)
Girardia paucipunctata Hellmann & Leal-Zanchet, 2018
Girardia pierremartini Souza & Leal-Zanchet, 2016
Girardia polyorchis (Fuhrmann, 1912)
Girardia rincona (Marcus, 1954)
Girardia sanchezi (Hyman, 1955)
Girardia schubarti (Marcus, 1946)
Girardia seclusa (de Beauchamp, 1940)
Girardia sinensis Chen & Wang, 2015
Girardia somuncura Lenguas Francavilla, Negrete, Martínez-Aquino, Damborenea & Brusa, 2021
Girardia spelaea Hellmann & Leal-Zanchet, 2020
Girardia sphincter Sluys & Kawakatsu, 2001
Girardia striata (Weiss, 1910)
Girardia tahitiensis Gourbault, 1977
Girardia tigrina (Girard, 1850)
Girardia tomasi Lenguas Francavilla, Negrete, Martínez-Aquino, Damborenea & Brusa, 2021
Girardia titicacana (Hyman, 1939)
Girardia typhlomexicana (Mitchell & Kawakatsu, 1973)
Girardia ururiograndeana (Kawakatsu, Hauser & Ponce de Leon, 1992)

Phylogeny

Phylogenetic tree including five dugesiid genera after Álvarez-Presas et al., 2008:

References

Dugesiidae
Rhabditophora genera
Animals described in 1974